Roselle Park is a New Jersey Transit railroad station in Roselle Park, New Jersey. Located on the Conrail Lehigh Line which is owned by Conrail Shared Assets Operations on West Lincoln Avenue between Chestnut Street and Locust Street, it is served by Raritan Valley Line trains that travel between Newark Penn Station and Raritan. There is also limited service between High Bridge and New York Penn Station and one weekday morning train to Hoboken Terminal.

History
The station is located at milepost 16.0 on the Conrail Lehigh Line. This is part of the former Lehigh Valley Railroad main line, built by LV subsidiary Newark & Roselle Railway. The second station to stand on the property, it was built in 1967 during the construction of the Aldene Plan. The Aldene Plan was a joint project between the railroads, New Jersey Department of Transportation, and The Port Authority of New York and New Jersey which elevated trackage above ground level to eliminate grade crossings and rerouted Central Railroad of New Jersey trains (one of NJ Transit's predecessor railroads) from its aging Jersey City terminal to Pennsylvania Station in Newark, New Jersey.

When bankruptcy struck, the Central Railroad of New Jersey and the Lehigh Valley Railroad were forced to fold into the Consolidated Rail Corporation on April 1, 1976. On that date, the New Jersey Department of Transportation took over commuter rail operations statewide. In 1981 the State of New Jersey created New Jersey Transit to oversee all commuter operations, rail and bus, in the state. Since then, NJ Transit has continued to operate and improve services on the Raritan Valley Line.

In Spring 1997, negotiations began for the joint purchase of Conrail by CSX Transportation and Norfolk Southern Railway. The Surface Transportation Board officially approved the acquisition and restructuring of Conrail on July 23, 1998. The approved restructuring plan transformed Conrail into a private, non-common carrier switching and terminal railroad that operates on behalf of its owners, using rolling stock and locomotives supplied by its owners. Property was divided using a system of railroad heritage, bringing ownership of the route and Roselle Park station to Norfolk Southern Railway. The purchase, often referred to as the "Conrail split" by railroaders, was made final on April 1, 1999.

Station layout and service
The station has one high-level island platform.

Freight operations
The station has a gauntlet track (a slightly shifted-over track) on the track 2 side that allows freight trains to pass the high level platform safely. Currently, freight trains past the station are operated by Conrail, CSX Transportation, and Norfolk Southern Railway. The route has become a critical artery in transcontinental transportation, particularly for intermodal, retail and petrochemical traffic. Tonnage over this route reaches as far west as Chicago and Los Angeles, south to Atlanta and Jacksonville, and east to Vermont and Maine. Currently 30-40 freights pass the station depending on the day of the week.

References

External links

Official Borough of Roselle Park Website
NJTransit Rail Operations Raritan Line Schedule
NJTransit Rail Operations DepartureVision: Roselle Park
NJTransit Rail Operations Roselle Park Station Information
Roselle Park Station Photos on Railroad Picture Archives
Roselle Park Station Photos on Railpictures.net

Railway stations in Union County, New Jersey
NJ Transit Rail Operations stations
Former Central Railroad of New Jersey stations
Stations on the Raritan Valley Line
Former Lehigh Valley Railroad stations
Railway stations opened in 1891
1891 establishments in New Jersey